Zeynep Korkmaz (born 5 July 1921) is a Turkish scholar and dialectologist.

Early life and education
Korkmaz was born in Nevşehir on 5 July 1921. Her parents are Yusuf Hüsnü Dengi and Şefika Dengi. She has an elder sister and a brother.

She received elementary and secondary education in İzmir. In 1940, she graduated from Izmir Girls' High School. She graduated from Ankara University with a Bachelor of Arts degree in Turkish language and literature in 1944. She completed her PhD studies at the same department in 1950. Her Ph.D. thesis was concerned with dialects of Anatolia.

Career
Following graduation, she became an assistant at the Faculty of Language, History and Geography (DTCF) of Ankara University in 1945. Then she began to work as an assistant at the department of Turkish language and literature of the same university in 1948. She went to Hamburg University for post-doctoral studies. She worked as a visiting scholar there from 1954 to 1955 and studied Old Turkish Language with A. von Gabain, O. Pritsak and O. Von Essen. She became associate professor in 1957 and professor in 1964. She retired in 1990.

Membership
Korkmaz is a member of the Turkish Culture Research Institute; Permanent International Altaistic Conference (PIAC); Ottoman-Pre-Ottoman Research Committee; Societas Uralo-Altaica; İLESAM (Professional Union of Turkish Science and Literature Academicians, Ankara).

Works
Korkmaz has 16 books and more than 250 articles about the Turkish language. Some of her books are given below:

(1963). Nevşehir ve Yöresi Ağızları (Turkish = Dialects of Nevşehir and nearby area), DTCF: Ankara

(1973). Cumhuriyet Döneminde Türk Dili (Turkish= Turkish Language in the Republic Era), DTCF:Ankara

On her 60th birthday in 1982, a book was published by her pupils with the title of Prof. Dr. Zeynep Korkmaz'ın Hayatı ve Eserleri (Prof. Dr. Zeynep Korkmaz's life and works).

Personal life
Korkmaz married Mehmet Korkmaz, who died in 1984. She has two children. Korkmaz turned 100 in July 2021.

References

1921 births
Living people
Dialectologists
People from Nevşehir
Ankara University alumni
Turkish women academics
Academic staff of the University of Hamburg
Turkish social scientists
Academic staff of Ankara University
Linguists from Turkey
Linguists of Turkic languages
20th-century Turkish women
21st-century Turkish women
Turkish centenarians
Women centenarians
Turkish expatriates in Germany